Prospect Hall may refer to:

Prospect Hall (Frederick, Maryland), listed on the National Register of Historic Places (NRHP)
North Avenue Congregational Church, now known as Prospect Hall, Cambridge, Massachusetts, NRHP-listed
Grand Prospect Hall, Brooklyn, New York, NRHP-listed

See also
Prospect House (disambiguation)